Philip Anthony Driver (born 10 August 1959) in Huddersfield, England, is an English retired professional footballer who played as a winger for Wimbledon and Chelsea in the Football League.

Driver was a keen amateur cricketer and played minor counties cricket for Hertfordshire from 1983–86, making seventeen appearances in the Minor Counties Championship and two appearances in the MCCA Knockout Trophy.

References

External links

St Albans City F.C. Statistics

1959 births
Living people
Cricketers from Huddersfield
English footballers
Association football wingers
Bedford Town F.C. players
Wimbledon F.C. players
Chelsea F.C. players
St Albans City F.C. players
English Football League players
Maidstone United F.C. (1897) players
English cricketers
Hertfordshire cricketers